SS Pampa was a French ocean liner converted into a troopship in world War I, which was torpedoed and sunk in the Mediterranean Sea  east of Valletta, Malta by  with the loss of 117 lives.

The Pampa was built as an ocean liner for service between Marseille and South-America. The ship was requisitioned by the Army and converted into a troop ship for use in World War I.

On 27 August 1918, she was sailing with French soldiers on board from Marseille via Bizerte to Thessaloniki in a convoy consisting of 5 other transport ships and 4 destroyers. She was torpedoed at 03:30 by German U-boat , commanded by Eberhard Weichold.

Sources
 Pages 14-18 discussions 
 Wreck site
 
 The Pampa in the Clydebuilt Ships Database (with image)
 A postcard with the Pampa from  1909

References

1906 ships
Maritime incidents in 1918
Passenger ships of France
Ships built on the River Clyde
Ships sunk by German submarines in World War I
World War I shipwrecks in the Mediterranean Sea